Below the Deadline is a 1929 American silent crime film directed by J.P. McGowan and starring Frank Leigh, Barbara Worth and Arthur Rankin.

Cast
 Frank Leigh as Beau Nash 
 Barbara Worth as Claire Byron  
 Arthur Rankin as Jimmy Byron  
 Walter Merrill as Donald Cornwall 
 J.P. McGowan as Taggart  
 Mike Donlin as Sandy  
 Virginia Sale as Mother Biblow  
 Lou Gory as Stella  
 Bill Patton as Johnston  
 Tiny Ward as Tubby  
 Charles H. Hickman as Police Captain  
 Fred Walton as Festenberg

References

Bibliography
 Michael R. Pitts. Poverty Row Studios, 1929-1940: An Illustrated History of 55 Independent Film Companies, with a Filmography for Each. McFarland & Company, 2005.

External links

1929 films
1929 crime films
American crime films
American silent feature films
Chesterfield Pictures films
American black-and-white films
Films directed by J. P. McGowan
1920s English-language films
1920s American films